Konongo may refer to:

Konongo people, an ethnolinguistic group in Tanzania
Konongo, Ghana, a town in Ghana's Ashanti region